"Flipmode" is a 2017 song by Fabolous, Chris Brown, and Velous. The song's title is derived from Busta Rhymes's record label "Flipmode Entertainment". The song also includes a reference to Flipmode artist Spliff Star. Originally released by Velous, the song was later remixed by Fabolous, and was intended to be included on his Summertime Shootout 3 mixtape.

Fabolous and Brown performed the song as a Tidal event in New York City on October 17, 2017.

Music video
The accompanying music video for the song draws inspiration from a 2001 Nike Freestyle commercial in which basketball players, such as Vince Carter, were featured. Directed by Gerard Victor, cameos made throughout the video include:
 DJ Khaled
 Odell Beckham Jr.
 T.I.
 Jeremih
 La La Anthony
 Terrence J
 Jadakiss
 Omari Hardwick
 Nasty C
 Trey Songz
 Emtee
 O.T. Genasis
 Draya Michele
 Blake Griffin
 Serena Williams
 Teyana Taylor
 Iman Shumpert
 Jermaine Dupri
 Mack Wilds
 Tory Lanez
 Rich the Kid
 Fat Joe

References

External links
 

Fabolous songs
Chris Brown songs
Songs written by Chris Brown
Songs written by Fabolous
2017 songs
Song recordings produced by Cubeatz